Zeppelin LZ 14, given the navy tactical number L 1, was a rigid airship built for the Kaiserliche Marine (Imperial German Navy) to carry out reconnaissance over the North Sea and enemy territory. It was first flown on 7 October 1912. On 9 September 1913, LZ 14 was on a patrol over the North Sea when it encountered a thunderstorm, which resulted in a forced landing/crash. Fourteen crew-members drowned, becoming the world's first ever Zeppelin casualties.

Specifications (LZ 14 / L 1)

See also

Helgoland Island air disaster
List of Zeppelins

References

Accidents and incidents involving balloons and airships
Accidents and incidents involving military aircraft
Airships of the Imperial German Navy
Hydrogen airships
Zeppelins
Airships of Germany
Airships